Jürgen Kretschmer (born 4 December 1947 in Zeitz) is a former East German slalom canoeist who competed in the early to mid-1970s. He won six medals at the ICF Canoe Slalom World Championships with four golds (C-2: 1971, 1975; C-2 team:1971, 1975), a silver (C-2: 1973) and a bronze (C-2 team: 1973).

Kretschmer also finished fourth in the C-2 event at the 1972 Summer Olympics in Munich.

References

1947 births
Canoeists at the 1972 Summer Olympics
German male canoeists
Living people
Olympic canoeists of East Germany
Medalists at the ICF Canoe Slalom World Championships
People from Zeitz
Sportspeople from Saxony-Anhalt